The Indonesian National Badminton Championships or officially known as the Kejuaraan Nasional PBSI is a tournament organized by the Badminton Association of Indonesia (PBSI) to crown the best badminton players in Indonesia.

Past winners

Seniors

Juniors

Team events

Mixed team

Men's and women's team

References 

 

Badminton tournaments in Indonesia
National badminton championships